Eva Dick (born 28 August 1956) is a German rower. She competed in the women's eight event at the 1976 Summer Olympics.

References

1956 births
Living people
German female rowers
Olympic rowers of West Germany
Rowers at the 1976 Summer Olympics
Sportspeople from Saarbrücken